Tumaseu is a village located on the island of Vaitupu, Tuvalu. According to the 2012 census, there were 248 inhabitants. The area of the village was 0.04 km2.

References 

Populated places in Tuvalu
Vaitupu